Traditions is the 22nd studio album by American musician Bobby Womack. The album was released on November 4, 1999, on The Right Stuff Records.

Track listing

References

1999 albums
Bobby Womack albums
The Right Stuff Records albums